Vanessa Taylor (born 24 September 1970) is an American screenwriter and television producer. She is known for writing Hope Springs, Divergent, and The Shape of Water, as well as for her work as a writer and co-executive producer on seasons two and three of Game of Thrones. Taylor also acted as a script doctor on Disney's 2019 live action remake of Aladdin. For The Shape of Water, she was nominated for the Academy Award for Best Original Screenplay.

Early life and education
As a child, Taylor wrote fairy tales. From age twelve, Taylor pursued acting and singing. She attended the Interlochen Center for the Arts in Michigan, and later joined The Groundlings for two years.

Career
Her television credits include Game of Thrones, Gideon's Crossing, Alias (hired by J. J. Abrams), Everwood (hired by Greg Berlanti), Tell Me You Love Me, and Cupid. She also co-created Jack & Bobby.

Taylor wrote Hope Springs, a 2012 film directed by David Frankel, with Meryl Streep, Tommy Lee Jones, and Steve Carell. Carell played Dr. Feld, “a marriage therapist who tries to help a couple rekindle their loveless relationship after 31 years of marriage.”

She co-wrote the screenplay for the 2014 sci-fi action film Divergent.

She also co-wrote the screenplay for the fantasy romance film The Shape of Water, along with its director, Guillermo del Toro.

In 2019, Taylor performed an uncredited re-write on Disney's live action remake of Aladdin, written by John August and Guy Ritchie, who also directed.

Awards and nominations
Taylor was nominated for two Primetime Emmy awards for Outstanding Drama Series for Game of Thrones in 2012 and 2013.

She was also nominated for a WGA Award (Drama Series) in 2013 for Game of Thrones.

In 2012, Taylor was nominated for a WIN Outstanding Writer Award (Outstanding Film or Show Written by a Woman) in 2012 for Hope Springs.

Alongside her The Shape of Water co-writer and director Guillermo del Toro, Taylor was honoured with the 2017 PEN Center USA Screenplay Award at the 27th Annual Literary Awards Festival.

She was nominated for the Academy Award for Best Original Screenplay for The Shape of Water. She was also nominated for the Saturn Award for Best Writing.

Filmography

Screenplays
 Hope Springs (2012)
 Divergent (2014)
 The Shape of Water (2017)
 Hillbilly Elegy (2020)
 The Uglies (TBA)

Production staff

Television writing

References

External linkas 
 

Living people
American women television writers
American television producers
American women television producers
American soap opera writers
Place of birth missing (living people)
American women screenwriters
Women soap opera writers
Year of birth missing (living people)
21st-century American women